The Samarkand Kufic Quran (also known as the Uthman Quran, Samarkand codex, Samarkand manuscript and Tashkent Quran) is an 8th or 9th century manuscript Quran written in the territory of modern Iraq in the Kufic script. Today it is kept in the Hast Imam library, in Tashkent, Uzbekistan.

It is said to have belonged to the third caliph, Uthman ibn Affan.

Dating the Manuscript
Based on orthographic and palaeographic studies, the manuscript probably dates from the 8th or 9th century. Radio-carbon dating showed a 95.4% probability of a date between 775 and 995. However, one of the folios from another manuscript (held in the Religious Administration of Muslims in Tashkent) was dated to between 595 and 855 A.D. with a likelihood of 95%.

History 
The copy of the Quran is traditionally considered to be one of a group commissioned by the third caliph Uthman; however, this attribution has been questioned. According to Islamic tradition, in 651, 19 years after the death of the Islamic Prophet, Muhammad, Uthman commissioned a committee to produce a standard copy of the text of the Quran (see Origin and development of the Quran). Five of these authoritative Qurans were sent to the major Muslim cities of the era, and Uthman kept one for his own use in Medina, although the Samarkand Quran is most likely not one of those copies. The only other surviving copy was thought to be the one held in Topkapı Palace in Turkey, but studies have shown that the Topkapı manuscript is also not from the 7th century, but from much later.

Uthman was succeeded by Ali, who took the uthmanic Quran to Kufa, now in Iraq. The subsequent history of this Quran is known only from legends. According to one of them, when Tamerlane captured the area, he took the Quran to his capital, Samarkand, as a treasure. According to another, the Quran was brought from the ruler of Rum to Samarkand by Khoja Ahrar, a Turkestani sufi master, as a gift after he had cured the ruler. 
 
The Quran remained in the Khoja Ahrar Mosque of Samarkand for four centuries until 1869, when the Russian general Abramov bought it from the Imams of the mosque and gave it to Konstantin von Kaufman, Governor-General of Turkestan, who in turn sent it to the Imperial Library in Saint Petersburg (now the Russian National Library). It attracted the attention of Orientalists and eventually a facsimile edition was published in Saint-Petersburg in 1905. The 50 copies soon became rarities. The first thorough description and dating of the manuscript was undertaken by the Russian Orientalist Shebunin in 1891.

After the October Revolution, Vladimir Lenin, in an act of goodwill to the Muslims of Russia, gave the Quran to the people of Ufa, Bashkortostan. After repeated appeals by the people of the Turkestan ASSR, the Quran was returned to Central Asia, to Tashkent, in 1924, where it has since remained.

Current state 

The parchment manuscript now is held in the library of the Telyashayakh Mosque, in the old "Hast-Imam" (Khazrati Imom) area of Tashkent, close to the grave of Kaffal Shashi, a 10th-century  Islamic scholar.

A folio containing a page from the sura Al-Anbiya is held at the Metropolitan Museum of Art in New York City, US.

The manuscript is incomplete: it begins in the middle of verse 7 of the second sura and ends at Surah 43:10. The manuscript has between eight and twelve lines to the page and, showing its antiquity, the text is devoid of vocalisation.

See also

 Birmingham manuscript
 Sanaa manuscript
 Topkapi manuscript
 Codex Parisino-petropolitanus

References

External links
  
 
 

Memory of the World Register
Quranic manuscripts
History of Samarkand
Religion in Tashkent
History of Tashkent
Uthman